Eucaliptus is a small town in Bolivia. In 2010 it had an estimated population of 2354.

References

Populated places in Oruro Department